Tatu Kolehmainen (21 April 1885 – 15 June 1967) was a Finnish long-distance runner who competed at the 1912 and 1920 Summer Olympics. In 1912 he reached the finals of 10,000 m and marathon races, but failed to finish due to a strong heat. In 1920 he placed 10th in the marathon. His younger brother Hannes competed alongside at the 1912 and 1920 Games.

References

External links
 

1885 births
1967 deaths
People from Kuopio
People from Kuopio Province (Grand Duchy of Finland)
Athletes (track and field) at the 1912 Summer Olympics
Athletes (track and field) at the 1920 Summer Olympics
Finnish male long-distance runners
Finnish male marathon runners
Olympic athletes of Finland
Sportspeople from North Savo